The Structure of the Argentine Army follows below. As of 2020 the active force of the Argentine Army includes a total of eleven brigades:

 2x Armored brigades (I, II)
 2x Bush brigades (III, XII)
 1x Airborne brigade (IV)
 3x Mountain brigades (V, VI, VIII)
 3x Mechanized brigades (IX, X, XI)

In addition to the brigades, there is also a number of specialized formations:
 Special Operations Forces Grouping
 Anti-aircraft Artillery Grouping 601 - School
 Army Aviation Grouping 601
 Engineer Grouping 601
 Signal Grouping 601

The "regiment" and "group" designators actually denote battalion-sized units ("regiment" being used for infantry and cavalry units and "group" used for artillery units).

1990s reorganization
Since the restoration of democracy in 1983, the Argentine Army was reduced both in number and budget and became a professional force. Some units were dissolved and other moved, including:

 the I Corps in Buenos Aires was dissolved
 the X Mechanized Brigade moved from Buenos Aires to La Pampa
 the VII Jungle Brigade was, in accordance with the friendship policy toward Brazil, dissolved

Chief of the Army General Staff 
 Chief of the Army General Staff (Jefe del Estado Mayor General del Ejército)
 Chief of the Army General Staff Adjutand Secretariat (Secretaría Ayudantía del JEMGE)
 Army Recruitment Assessment Commission (Comisión Evaluadora de Contrataciones del Ejército)
 Army Main Inspectorate (Inspectoría General del Ejército)
 Army Main Secretariat (Secretaría General del Ejército)
 Plan, Programs and Budget Main Directorate (Dirección General de Planes, Programas y Presupuesto)
 Administration and Finance Main Directorate (Dirección General de Administración y Finanzas)
 Legal Affairs Main Directorate (Dirección General de Asuntos Jurídicos)
 Army Social Work Institute (Instituto de Obra Social del Ejército)

Deputy Chief of the Army General Staff 
The Deputy Chief of the Army General Staff commands the following organizations and departments of the Argentine Army:

 Deputy Chief of the Army General Staff (Subjefe del Estado Mayor General del Ejército)
 Coordination Secretariat of the Deputy Chief of the Army General Staff (Secretaría de Coordinación del Subjefe del Estado Mayor General del Ejército)
 Army General Staff Headquarters (Cuartel General del Estado Mayor General del Ejército)
 Education Main Directorate(Dirección General de Educación)
 Communication and Information Main Directorate (Dirección General de Comunicaciones e Informática)
 Signal Battalion 602 (Batallón de Comunicaciones 602), in Buenos Aires
 Satellite Signal Company (Compañía de Comunicaciones Satelital 601), in Campo de Mayo
 Personnel and Welfare Main Directorate (Dirección General de Personal y Bienestar)
 Medical Main Directorate (Dirección General de Salud)
 Central Military Hospital, in Buenos Aires
 Campo de Mayo Military Hospital, in Campo de Mayo
 Regional Military Hospital Córdoba
 Regional Military Hospital Mendoza
 Regional Military Hospital Comodoro Rivadavia
 Regional Military Hospital Paraná
 Military Hospital Bahía Blanca
 Military Hospital Salta
 Military Hospital Río Gallegos
 Military Hospital Curuzú Cuatiá
 Intelligence Main Directorate (Dirección General de Inteligencia)
 Intelligence Grouping "Campo de Mayo" (Agrupación de Inteligencia «Campo de Mayo»), in Campo de Mayo
 Intelligence Support Battalion (Batallón Apoyo de Inteligencia), in Campo de Mayo
 Signals Intelligence Company (Compañía de Inteligencia de Señales), in City Bell 
 Combat Intelligence Detachment 601  (Destacamento de Inteligencia de Combate 601), in Campo de Mayo
 Geospatial Intelligence Center (Central de Inteligencia Geoespacial), in Campo de Mayo
 Military Intelligence Center (Central de Inteligencia Militar), in Campo de Mayo
 Research and Development Main Directorate (Dirección General de Investigación y Desarrollo)
 Organization and Doctrine Main Directorate (Dirección General de Organización y Doctrina)
 Materiel Main Directorate (Dirección General de Material), in Palermo
 Arsenal Directorate (Dirección de Arsenales), in Boulogne Sur Mer
 Arsenal Grouping 601 (Agrupación de Arsenales 601), in Boulogne Sur Mer
 Arsenal Battalion 601 (Batallón de Arsenales 601), in Boulogne sur Mer
 Arsenal Battalion 602 (Batallón de Arsenales 602), in Boulogne sur Mer
 Arsenal Battalion 603 (Batallón de Arsenales 603), in San Lorenzo
 Arsenal Battalion 604 (Batallón de Arsenales 604), in Holmberg
 Electronic Materiel Maintenance Company 601 (Compañía de Mantenimiento de Materiales Electrónicos 601), in Boulogne Sur Mer
 Transport Directorate (Dirección de Transporte), in Palermo
 Transport Battalion 601 (Batallón de Transporte 601), in Boulogne Sur Mer
 Quartermaster Directorate (Dirección de Intendencia)
 Quartermaster Battalion 601 (Batallón de Intendencia 601), in El Palomar
 Stable and Veterinary Directorate (Dirección de Remonta y Veterinaria)
 Engineers and Infrastructure Directorate (Dirección de Ingenieros e Infraestructura)
 Army General Staff Accounting and Finance Directorate (Dirección de Contaduría y Finanzas del Estado Mayor General del Ejército)
 Army Historical Matters Directorate (Dirección de Asuntos Históricos del Ejército)

Buenos Aires Military Garrison 
 Buenos Aires Military Garrison (Guarnición Militar Buenos Aires), in Campo de Mayo
 Infantry Regiment 1 "Patricios" (Regimiento de Infantería 1 «Patricios»), in Palermo
 Mounted Grenadier Regiment "General San Martín" (Regimiento de Granaderos a Caballo «General San Martín»), in Palermo
 Artillery Regiment 1 (Regimiento de Artillería 1), in Campo de Mayo
 Military Police Company 601 (Compañía Policía Militar 601), in Campo de Mayo

Army Training and Enlistment Command 
 Army Training and Enlistment Command (Comando de Adiestramiento y Alistamiento del Ejército), in Campo de Mayo

The Army Training and Enlistment Command is responsible for the training and preparation of the operational units of the Argentinian Army.

1st Army Division 
 1st Army Division (1.ª División de Ejército), in Curuzú Cuatiá
 Engineer Battalion 1 (Batallón de Ingenieros 1), in Santo Tomé
 Amphibious Engineer Battalion 121 (Batallón de Ingenieros Anfibio 121), in Santo Tomé
 Signal Battalion 121 (Batallón de Comunicaciones 121), in Mercedes
 Intelligence Battalion 121 (Batallón de Inteligencia 121), in Curuzú Cuatiá
 Army Aviation Section 121 (Sección de Aviación de Ejército 121), in Resistencia
 Garrison Guard Detachment "Crespo" (Destacamento de Vigilancia de Cuartel «Crespo»), in Crespo
 Garrison Guard Detachment "Guadalupe" (Destacamento de Vigilancia de Cuartel «Guadalupe»), in Guadalupe Norte

II Armored Brigade 
 II Armored Brigade (IIda Brigada Blindada), in Paraná
 Reconnaissance Cavalry Regiment 12 (Regimiento de Caballería de Exploración 12), in Gualeguaychú
 Tank Cavalry Regiment 1 (Regimiento de Caballería de Tanques 1), in Villaguay
 Tank Cavalry Regiment 6 (Regimiento de Caballería de Tanques 6), in Concordia
 Tank Cavalry Regiment 7 (Regimiento de Caballería de Tanques 7), in Chajarí
 Mechanized Infantry Regiment 5 (Regimiento de Infantería Mecanizado 5), in Villaguay
 Armored Artillery Group 2 (Grupo de Artillería Blindado 2), in Rosario del Tala
 Armored Engineer Battalion 2 (Batallón de Ingenieros Blindado 2), in Concepción del Uruguay
 Armored Signal Squadron 2 (Escuadrón de Comunicaciones Blindado 2), in Paraná
 Armored Intelligence Squadron 2 (Escuadrón de Inteligencia Blindado 2), in Santa Fe
 Logistic Support Base "Paraná" (Base de Apoyo Logístico "Paraná"), in Paraná
 Logistic Support Base "San Lorenzo" (Base de Apoyo Logístico "San Lorenzo"), in San Lorenzo

III Bush Brigade 
 III Bush Brigade (IIIra Brigada de Monte), in Resistencia
 Mechanized Infantry Regiment 4 (Regimiento de Infantería Mecanizado 4), in Monte Caseros
 Bush Infantry Regiment 28 (Regimiento de Infantería de Monte 28), in Tartagal
 Bush Infantry Regiment 29 (Regimiento de Infantería de Monte 29), in Formosa
 Bush Rangers Company 17 (Compañía de Cazadores de Monte 17), in Tartagal
 Bush Artillery Group 12 (Grupo de Artillería de Monte 12), in Mercedes
 Bush Engineer Company 3 (Compañía de Ingenieros de Monte 3), in Corrientes
 Bush Signal Company 3 (Compañía de Comunicaciones de Monte 3), in Resistencia
 Bush Intelligence Company 3 (Compañía de Inteligencia de Monte 3), in Resistencia
 Bush Intelligence Section "Formosa" (Sección de Inteligencia de Monte «Formosa»), in Formosa
 Bush Intelligence Section "Tartagal" (Sección de Inteligencia de Monte «Tartagal»), in Tartagal
 Bush Army Aviation Section 3 (Sección de Aviación de Ejército de Monte 3), in Resistencia
 Logistic Support Base "Resistencia" (Base de Apoyo Logístico "Resistencia"), in Resistencia
 Logistic Support Base "Curuzú Cuatiá" (Base de Apoyo Logístico "Curuzú Cuatiá"), in Curuzú Cuatiá

XII Bush Brigade 
 XII Bush Brigade (XIIda Brigada de Monte), in Posadas
 Bush Infantry Regiment 9 (Regimiento de Infantería de Monte 9), in San Javier
 Bush Infantry Regiment 30 (Regimiento de Infantería de Monte 30), in Apóstoles
 Bush Rangers Company 18 (Compañía de Cazadores de Monte 18), in Bernardo de Irigoyen
 Bush Artillery Group 3 (Grupo de Artillería de Monte 3), in Paso de los Libres
 Bush Engineer Battalion 12 (Batallón de Ingenieros de Monte 12), in Goya
 Bush Cavalry Reconnaissance Squadron 12 (Escuadrón de Exploración de Caballería de Monte 12), in Posadas
 Bush Signal Company 12 (Compañía de Comunicaciones de Monte 12), in Posadas
 Bush Intelligence Company 12 (Compañía de Inteligencia de Monte 12), in Posadas
 Bush Intelligence Section "Iguazú" (Sección de Inteligencia de Monte «Iguazú»), in Iguazú
 Bush Intelligence Section "Paso de los Libres" (Sección de Inteligencia de Monte «Paso de los Libres»), in Paso de los Libres
 Bush Army Aviation Section 12 (Sección de Aviación de Ejército de Monte 12), in Posadas
 Bush Arsenal Company 12 (Compañía de Arsenales de Monte 12), in Posadas
 Medical Company 12 (Compañía de Sanidad 12), in Posadas
 Garrison Guard Detachment "Paso de los Libres" (Destacamento de Vigilancia de Cuartel «Paso de los Libres»), in Paso de los Libres

2nd Army Division 
 2nd Army Division (2.ª División de Ejército), in Córdoba
 Anti-aircraft Artillery Group 161 (Grupo de Artillería Antiaéreo 161), in San Luis
 Signal Battalion 141 (Batallón de Comunicaciones 141), in Córdoba
 Intelligence Battalion 141 (Batallón de Inteligencia 141), in Córdoba
 Army Aviation Section 141 (Sección de Aviación de Ejército 141), in Córdoba
 Garrison Guard Detachment "Santiago del Estero" (Destacamento de Vigilancia de Cuartel «Santiago del Estero»), in Santiago del Estero

V Mountain Brigade 
 V Mountain Brigade (Vta Brigada de Montaña), in Salta
 Mountain Reconnaissance Cavalry Regiment 5 (Regimiento de Caballería de Exploración de Montaña 5), in Salta
 Mountain Infantry Regiment 15 (Regimiento de Infantería de Montaña 15), in La Rioja
 Mountain Infantry Regiment 20 (Regimiento de Infantería de Montaña 20), in San Salvador de Jujuy
 Mountain Rangers Company 5 (Compañía de Cazadores de Montaña 5), in San Salvador de Jujuy
 Mountain Artillery Group 5 (Grupo de Artillería de Montaña 5), in San Salvador de Jujuy
 Artillery Group 15 (Grupo de Artillería 15), in Salta
 Mountain Engineer Battalion 5 (Batallón de Ingenieros de Montaña 5), in Salta
 Mountain Construction Engineer Company 5 (Compañía de Ingenieros de Construcciones de Montaña 5), in La Rioja
 Mountain Signal Company 5 (Compañía de Comunicaciones de Montaña 5), in Salta
 Mountain Intelligence Company 5 (Compañía de Inteligencia de Montaña 5), in Salta
 Mountain Intelligence Section "Jujuy" (Sección de Inteligencia de Montaña «Jujuy»), in San Salvador de Jujuy
 Forward Deployed Intelligence Section "La Rioja" (Sección de Inteligencia Adelantada «La Rioja»), in La Rioja
 Mountain Army Aviation Section 5 (Sección de Aviación de Ejército de Montaña 5), in Salta
 Logistic Support Base "Salta" (Base de Apoyo Logístico "Salta"), in Salta
 Garrison Guard Group "San Antonio de los Cobres" (Grupo de Vigilancia de Cuartel «San Antonio de los Cobres»), in San Antonio de los Cobres

VI Mountain Brigade 
 VI Mountain Brigade (VIta Brigada de Montaña), in Neuquén
 Mountain Reconnaissance Cavalry Regiment 4 (Regimiento de Caballería de Exploración de Montaña 4), in San Martín de los Andes
 Mountain Infantry Regiment 10 (Regimiento de Infantería de Montaña 10), in Covunco Centro
 Mountain Infantry Regiment 21 (Regimiento de Infantería de Montaña 21), in Las Lajas
 Mountain Infantry Regiment 26 (Regimiento de Infantería de Montaña 26), in Junín de los Andes
 Mountain Rangers Company 6 (Compañía de Cazadores de Montaña 6), in Primeros Pinos
 Mountain Artillery Group 6 (Grupo de Artillería de Montaña 6), in Junín de los Andes
 Artillery Group 16 (Grupo de Artillería 16), in Zapala
 Mountain Engineer Battalion 6 (Batallón de Ingenieros de Montaña 6), in Neuquén
 Mountain Signal Company 6 (Compañía de Comunicaciones de Montaña 6), in Neuquén
 Mountain Intelligence Company 6 (Compañía de Inteligencia de Montaña 5), in Neuquén
 Mountain Intelligence Section "Bariloche" (Sección de Inteligencia de Montaña «Bariloche»), in Bariloche
 Mountain Army Aviation Section 6 (Sección de Aviación de Ejército de Montaña 6), in Neuquén
 Logistic Support Base "Neuquén" (Base de Apoyo Logístico "Neuquén"), in Zapala

VIII Mountain Brigade 
 VIII Mountain Brigade (VIIIva Brigada de Montaña), in Mendoza
 Mountain Reconnaissance Cavalry Regiment 15 (Regimiento de Caballería de Exploración de Montaña 15), in Campo de los Andes
 Mountain Infantry Regiment 11 (Regimiento de Infantería de Montaña 11), in Tupungato
 Mountain Infantry Regiment 16 (Regimiento de Infantería de Montaña 16), in Uspallata
 Mountain Infantry Regiment 22 (Regimiento de Infantería de Montaña 22), in El Marquesado
 Mountain Rangers Company 8 (Compañía de Cazadores de Montaña 8), in Puente del Inca
 Artillery Group 7 (Grupo de Artillería 7), in San Luis
 Mountain Artillery Group 8 (Grupo de Artillería de Montaña 8), in Uspallata
 Mountain Engineer Battalion 8 (Batallón de Ingenieros de Montaña 8), in Campo de los Andes
 Mountain Signal Company 8 (Compañía de Comunicaciones de Montaña 8), in Mendoza
 Mountain Intelligence Company 8 (Compañía de Inteligencia de Montaña 5), in Mendoza
 Mountain Intelligence Section "San Rafael" (Sección de Inteligencia de Montaña «San Rafael»), in San Rafael
 Mountain Army Aviation Section 8 (Sección de Aviación de Ejército de Montaña 8), in Mendoza
 Logistic Support Base "Mendoza" (Base de Apoyo Logístico "Mendoza"), in Mendoza

3rd Army Division 
 3rd Army Division (3.ª División de Ejército), in Bahía Blanca
 Signal Battalion 181 (Batallón de Comunicaciones 181), in Bahía Blanca
 Intelligence Battalion 181 (Batallón de Inteligencia 181), in Bahía Blanca
 Army Aviation Section 181 (Sección de Aviación de Ejército 181), in Bahía Blanca

I Armored Brigade 
 I Armored Brigade (Ira Brigada Blindada), in Tandil
 Tank Cavalry Regiment 2 (Regimiento de Caballería de Tanques 2), in Olavarría
 Tank Cavalry Regiment 8 (Regimiento de Caballería de Tanques 8), in Magdalena
 Tank Cavalry Regiment 10 (Regimiento de Caballería de Tanques 10), in Azul
 Mechanized Infantry Regiment 7 (Regimiento de Infantería Mecanizado 7), in Arana
 Armored Artillery Group 1 (Grupo de Artillería Blindado 1), in Azul
 Armored Cavalry Reconnaissance Squadron 1 (Escuadrón de Exploración de Caballería Blindado 1), in Arana
 Armored Engineer Squadron 1 (Escuadrón de Ingenieros Blindado 1), in Olavarría
 Armored Signal Squadron 1 (Escuadrón de Comunicaciones Blindado 1), in Tandil
 Armored Intelligence Squadron 1 (Escuadrón de Inteligencia Blindado 1), in Tandil
 Logistic Support Base "Tandil" (Base de Apoyo Logístico "Tandil"), in Tandil

IX Mechanized Brigade 
 IX Mechanized Brigade (IXna Brigada Mecanizada), in Comodoro Rivadavia
 Reconnaissance Cavalry Regiment 3 (Regimiento de Caballería de Exploración 3), in Esquel
 Tank Cavalry Regiment 9 (Regimiento de Caballería de Tanques 9), in Puerto Deseado
 Mechanized Infantry Regiment 8 (Regimiento de Infantería Mecanizado 8), in Comodoro Rivadavia
 Mechanized Infantry Regiment 25 (Regimiento de Infantería Mecanizado 25), in Sarmiento
 Armored Artillery Group 9 (Grupo de Artillería Blindado 9), in Sarmiento
 Mechanized Engineer Battalion 9 (Batallón de Ingenieros Mecanizado 9), in Rio Mayo
 Mechanized Signal Company 9 (Compañía de Comunicaciones Mecanizada 9), in Comodoro Rivadavia
 Mechanized Intelligence Company 9 (Compañía de Inteligencia Mecanizada 9), in Comodoro Rivadavia
 Forward Deployed Intelligence Section "Esquel" (Sección de Inteligencia Adelantada «Esquel»), in Esquel
 Army Aviation Section 9 (Sección de Aviación de Ejército 9), in Comodoro Rivadavia
 Logistic Support Base "Comodoro Rivadavia" (Base de Apoyo Logístico "Comodoro Rivadavia"), in Comodoro Rivadavia

XI Mechanized Brigade 
 XI Mechanized Brigade (XIra Brigada Mecanizada), in Río Gallegos
 Tank Cavalry Regiment 11 (Regimiento de Caballería de Tanques 11), in Puerto Santa Cruz
 Mechanized Infantry Regiment 24 (Regimiento de Infantería Mecanizado 24), in Río Gallegos
 Mechanized Infantry Regiment 35 (Regimiento de Infantería Mecanizado 35), in Rospentek
 Armored Artillery Group 11 (Grupo de Artillería Blindado 11), in Comandante Luis Piedrabuena
 Mechanized Engineer Battalion 11 (Batallón de Ingenieros Mecanizado 11), in Comandante Luis Piedrabuena
 Armored Cavalry Reconnaissance Squadron 11 (Escuadrón de Exploración de Caballería Blindado 11), in Rospentek
 Mechanized Signal Company 11 (Compañía de Comunicaciones Mecanizada 11), in Río Gallegos
 Mechanized Intelligence Company 11 (Compañía de Inteligencia Mecanizada 2), in Río Gallegos
 Mechanized Intelligence Section "El Turbio" (Sección de Inteligencia Mecanizada «El Turbio»), in Rospentek
 Army Aviation Section 11 (Sección de Aviación de Ejército 11), in Río Gallegos
 Ammunition Company 181 (Compañía de Munición 181), in Puerto Santa Cruz
 Logistic Support Base "Río Gallegos" (Base de Apoyo Logístico "Río Gallegos"), in Río Gallegos

Anti-aircraft Artillery Grouping 601 - School 
 Anti-aircraft Artillery Grouping 601 - School (Agrupación de Artillería Antiaérea de Ejército 601 - Escuela), in Mar del Plata
 Anti-aircraft Artillery Group 601 (Grupo de Artillería Antiaéreo 601), in Mar del Plata
 Mixed Anti-aircraft Artillery Group 602 (Grupo de Artillería Antiaéreo Mixto 602), in Mar del Plata
 Anti-aircraft Artillery Systems Maintenance Group 601 (Grupo de Mantenimiento de Sistemas de Artillería Antiaéreos 601), in Mar del Plata)

Rapid Deployment Force 
 Rapid Deployment Force (Fuerza de Despliegue Rápido), in Campo de Mayo
 Rapid Deployment Force Signal Company (Compañía de Comunicaciones de la Fuerza de Despliegue Rápido), in Campo de Mayo
 Rapid Deployment Intelligence Section (Sección de Inteligencia de Despliegue Rápido), in Campo de Mayo
 Rapid Deployment Army Aviation Section (Sección de Aviación de Ejército de Despliegue Rápido), in Campo de Mayo

IV Airborne Brigade 
 IV Airborne Brigade (IVta Brigada Aerotransportada), in Córdoba
 Paratrooper Infantry Regiment 2 (Regimiento de Infantería Paracaidista 2), in Córdoba
 Paratrooper Infantry Regiment 14 (Regimiento de Infantería Paracaidista 14), in Córdoba
 Air Assault Regiment 601 (Regimiento de Asalto Aéreo 601), in Campo de Mayo
 Paratrooper Artillery Group 4 (Grupo de Artillería Paracaidista 4), in Córdoba
 Paratrooper Cavalry Reconnaissance Squadron 4 (Escuadrón de Exploración de Caballería Paracaidista 4), in Córdoba
 Paratrooper Engineer Company 4 (Compañía de Ingenieros Paracaidista 4), in Córdoba
 Paratrooper Signal Company 4 (Compañía de Comunicaciones Paracaidista 4), in Córdoba
 Paratrooper Aerial Launch Support Company 4 (Compañía de Apoyo de Lanzamientos Aéreos Paracaidista 4), in Córdoba
 Paratroopers Intelligence Section (Sección de Inteligencia Paracaidista), in Córdoba
 Logistic Support Base "Córdoba" (Base de Apoyo Logístico "Córdoba"), in Córdoba

X Mechanized Brigade 
 X Mechanized Brigade (Xma Brigada Mecanizada), in Santa Rosa
 Tank Cavalry Regiment 13 (Regimiento de Caballería de Tanques 13), in General Pico
 Mechanized Infantry Regiment 3 (Regimiento de Infantería Mecanizado 3), in Pigüé
 Mechanized Infantry Regiment 6 (Regimiento de Infantería Mecanizado 6), in Toay
 Mechanized Infantry Regiment 12 (Regimiento de Infantería Mecanizado 12), in Toay
 Artillery Group 10 (Grupo de Artillería 10), in Junín
 Multiple Launch Systems Artillery Group 601 (Grupo de Artillería de Sistemas de Lanzadores Múltiples 601), in San Luis
 Mechanized Engineer Company 10 (Compañía de Ingenieros Mecanizada 10), in Santa Rosa
 Mechanized Signal Company 10 (Compañía de Comunicaciones Mecanizada 10), in Santa Rosa
 Mechanized Intelligence Company 10 (Compañía de Inteligencia Mecanizada 10), in Santa Rosa
 Logistic Support Base "Pigüé" (Base de Apoyo Logístico "Pigüé"), in Pigüé

Special Operations Forces Grouping 
 Special Operations Forces Grouping (Agrupación de Fuerzas de Operaciones Especiales), in Córdoba
 Special Forces Company 601 (Compañía de Fuerzas Especiales 601), in Córdoba
 Commando Company 601 (Compañía de Comandos 601), in Campo de Mayo
 Commando Company 602 (Compañía de Comandos 602), in Córdoba
 Commando Company 603 (Compañía de Comandos 603), in Bahia Blanca
 Special Operations Forces Support Company 601 (Compañía de Apoyo de Fuerzas de Operaciones Especiales 601), in Campo de Mayo

Army Aviation Command 
 Army Aviation Command (Comando de Aviación del Ejército), in Campo de Mayo
 Army Aviation Grouping 601 (Agrupación de Aviación de Ejército 601), in Campo de Mayo
 Assault Helicopter Battalion 601 (Batallón de Helicópteros de Asalto 601), in Campo de Mayo
 Combat Support Aviation Battalion 601 (Batallón de Aviación de Apoyo de Combate 601), in Campo de Mayo
 Supply and Aircraft Maintenance Battalion 601 (Batallón de Abastecimiento y Mantenimiento de Aeronaves 601), in Campo de Mayo
 Attack and Reconnaissance Aviation Squadron 602 (Escuadrón de Aviación de Exploración y Ataque 602), in Campo de Mayo
 Support Aviation Squadron 604 (Escuadrón de Aviación de Apoyo 604), in Campo de Mayo

Engineer Grouping 601 
 Engineer Grouping 601 (Agrupación de Ingenieros 601), in Campo de Mayo
 Engineer Battalion 601 (Batallón de Ingenieros 601), in Campo de Mayo
 CBRN and Emergency Support Engineer Company 601 (Compañía de Ingenieros QBN y de Apoyo a la Emergencia 601), in San Nicolás de los Arroyos
 Installations Maintenance Engineer Company 601 (Compañía de Ingenieros de Mantenimiento de Instalaciones 601), in Villa Martelli
 Army Divers Engineer Company 601 (Compañía de Ingenieros de Buzos de Ejército 601), in Campo de Mayo
 Water Engineer Company 601 (Compañía de Ingenieros de Agua 601), in Campo de Mayo

Signal Grouping 601 
 Signal Grouping 601 (Agrupación de Comunicaciones 601), in City Bell
 Signal Battalion 601 (Batallón de Comunicaciones 601), in City Bell
 Electronic Operations Battalion 601 (Batallón de Operaciones Electrónicas 601), in City Bell
 Signal Maintenance Battalion 601 (Batallón de Mantenimiento de Comunicaciones 601), in City Bell

Graphic overview of the Argentine Army

Geographic distribution of operational forces

References

External links 
 Official website
 Organization and equipment

Army units and formations of Argentina
Argentine Army